Rushup Edge is the first and only LP release by The Tuss. Although credited to Karen Tregaskin, it was written by Richard D. James. The release is named after a mountain ridge in Derbyshire.  Originally released in 2007, the album was re-released with extra tracks on James' Bleep Store on 20 July 2017.

It was his last released project until the 2014 album under the Aphex Twin alias, Syro.

Track listing

Original release

Released on CD and vinyl. The vinyl version consists of three separate records, with one track on each side. Speed was at 45 rpm.

Later in 2009, WAV files would be released on the Rephlex website.

2017 re-release

Most of the new tracks are exclusively digital. However, slightly different versions of "[S770/SCI 3000,powertran] beautiful Japanese people" and "talkin2u mix2 +9" appeared on the "Aphex Mt. Fuji 2017" cassette.

The former was named as "Nagradrums 2+7," and the latter as "Talkin2u Mix2." 
"Nagradrums 2+7" was 41 seconds longer than the Rushup version and both are of lower quality.

References

External links 
CD entry at discogs.com
3x12" vinyl entry at discogs.com
Soundtrack IMDb

2007 debut albums
Rephlex Records albums